Shichidō garan is a Japanese Buddhist term indicating the seven halls composing the ideal Buddhist temple compound. The term is often shortened to just garan. In practice, shichidō garan often simply means a large temple with many buildings.

Etymology and history of the term
 in Japanese is an abbreviated form of the expression , itself a transliteration of the Sanskrit saMghaaraama (सँघाराम), literally meaning "garden for monks". A Japanese garan was originally just a park where monks gathered together with their teacher, but the term later came to mean "Buddhist temple".

The word garan can be found in a record in Nihon Shoki dated 552, although no monastery of this time survives, so we don't know what they were like.

The compound word  is found in a much more recent literature of Edo period, referring to a complex that had a complete set of buildings forming an ideal Buddhist temple.

Early garan layout 
Excavations carried out between 1979-1980 on the temple site of Jeongnimsa in Buyeo, capital of Baekje from 538 to 663, revealed that the original temple was laid out in a typical north-to-south style with key buildings put on the center axis, which was an arrangement closely adhered to at Shitennō-ji in Ōsaka.

Composition of a shichidō garan
What is counted in the group of seven buildings, or shichidō, can vary greatly from temple to temple, from sect to sect, and from time to time. As mentioned above, shichidō garan could mean a complete temple or even simply a large temple complex.

According to a 13th-century text, "a garan is a temple with a kon-dō (main hall), a tō (pagoda), a kō-dō (lecture hall), a shōrō (belfry), a jiki-dō (refectory), a sōbō (monks' living quarters), and a kyōzō (scriptures deposit, library)." These are the seven listed as shichidō elements of a  temple.

A 15th-century text describes how Zen school temples (Sōtō, Rinzai) included a butsuden or butsu-dō (main hall), a hattō (lecture hall), a kuin (kitchen/office), a sō-dō (building dedicated to Zazen), a sanmon (main gate), a tōsu (toilet) and a yokushitsu (bath).

Loss of importance of the pagoda within the garan

Because of the relics they contained, wooden pagodas used to be the centerpiece of the garan, the seven edifices considered indispensable for a temple. They gradually lost importance and were replaced by the kondō (golden hall), because of the magic powers believed to lie within the images the building housed. This loss of status was so complete that the Zen sects, which arrived late in Japan from China, normally do not build any pagoda at all. The layout of four early temples clearly illustrates this trend: they are in chronological order Asuka-dera, Shitennō-ji, Hōryū-ji, and Yakushi-ji. In the first, the pagoda was at the very center of the garan surrounded by three small kondō (see the reconstruction of the temple's original layout). In the second, a single kondō is at the center of the temple and the pagoda lies in front of it. At Hōryū-ji, they are one next to the other. Yakushi-ji has a single, large kondō at the center with two pagodas on the sides. The same evolution can be observed in Buddhist temples in China.

Examples of garan

Hōryū-ji

 is a Buddhist temple of the "Shōtoku" sect in Ikaruga, Nara Prefecture, Japan. Its garan is composed of (see plan on the right):

A Chūmon (中門) 
In a temple, the gate after the naindaimon connected to a kairō

B Kairō (回廊・廻廊) 
A long and roofed portico-like passage surrounding the kondō and the pagoda.

C Kon-dō (金堂)
The main hall of a garan, housing the main object of worship.

D Tō
A pagoda, which is an evolution of the stupa (a kind of reliquary) . After reaching China, the stupa evolved into a tower with an odd number of tiers (three, five, seven, nine, thirteen).

E Kōdō (講堂) 
The lecture hall of a non-Zen garan.

F Kyōzō (経蔵) 
Lit. "scriptures deposit". Repository of sūtras and books about the temple's history. Also called kyōdō.

G Shōrō (鐘楼) 
A belfry

Zuiryū-ji

Zuiryū-ji is a Zen  temple of the Sōtō sect in Takaoka, Toyama Prefecture.

A Sōmon (総門)
The gate at the entrance of a temple. It precedes the bigger and more important sanmon.

B Sanmon (三門 or 山門)
The gate in front of the butsuden, most commonly having two stories (nijūmon). Its openings (and ) symbolize the three gates to enlightenment.

C Kairō (回廊)
See above

D Butsuden (仏殿)
Lit. "Hall of Buddha". A building enshrining the statue of Buddha or of a bodhisattva and dedicated to prayer.

E Hōdō (法堂)
Lit. "Dharma hall". A building dedicated to lectures by the chief priest on Buddhism's scriptures (the hō).

F Zendō (禅堂) 
Lit. "hall of Zen". The building where monks practice zazen, and one of the main structures of a Zen garan.

G Shōrō (鐘楼) 
A belfry

H Kuri (庫裏) 
A building hosting the galleys, the kitchen, and the offices of a Zen garan.

Another typical Zen garan, of which Kenchō-ji's is a good example, begins with the sōmon followed by the sanmon, the main hall (the butsuden), the lecture hall (hattō), and the chief abbot's residence (hōjō) all aligned more or less on a north to south axis, with the bath house (yokushitsu) and the sūtra repository (kyōzō) to its east, and the monks' hall (sodō) to its west.

See also 
 For an explanation of terms concerning Japanese Buddhism, Japanese Buddhist art, and Japanese Buddhist temple architecture, see the Glossary of Japanese Buddhism.

Notes

References
 Japanese Art Net User System Dictionary of Japanese Architectural and Art Historical Terminology accessed on April 27, 2009
 Iwanami  Japanese dictionary, 6th Edition (2008), DVD version

Japanese Buddhist architecture